Gökberk Demirci is a Turkish actor known for Yemin (2019), Hayatımın Aşkı (2016), and Arka Sokaklar (2012).

Education 
He took acting lessons in Cengiz Küçükayvaz theater.

Career 

Gökberk Demirci, who started his acting career with a minor role in the TV series, Bir Zamanlar Osmanlı: Kıyam (2012), is playing the lead actor in the TV series Yemin as Emir produced by Kanal 7.

Filmography

Television

Film

References

External links 

 
 

Living people
Turkish male television actors
Turkish male film actors
21st-century Turkish male actors
Year of birth missing (living people)